Aishah Jennifer Mohamed Sinclair (born 27 October 1980 in Wimbledon, London, England)  is a Malaysian actress, television host and radio announcer. Currently she is the face of Softlan and the spokesperson for Yayasan Anak Warisan Alam (YAWA), a Malaysian non-profit organization established to instill a love of the environment in youths.

Background
Aishah was born to pharmacist Mohammed Anthony John Sinclair and Khadijah Abdul Rahman who are of British (Irish-English-Scottish) and Malay descent respectively. She has an older brother, actor Ashraf Sinclair and a younger brother, Adam. Due to her father’s career, Aishah grew up in England and Saudi Arabia, before moving back to Malaysia in 1986. She was a British citizen before becoming a Malaysian citizen when she was sixteen years old.

She holds a Bachelors in Mass Communication from Universiti Teknologi Mara.

Career

HOSTING

2005 
Life Traits (Season 1 & 2) RTM2
Voice Your Choice  8TV

2006 
8TV Quickie 8TV
Red Carpet for Anugerah Juara Lagu 2007 TV3
Rock Unite NTV7

2007 
Rock Unite NTV7
8TV Quickie 8TV

2008 
Venus NTV7
So You Think You Can Dance 28TV
Double Exposure - Photography Reality Show Online

ACTING

2005 
Cameo appearance in Gol & Gincu Movie
Bujang Senang Movie

2006 
Cameo role in Gol & Gincu Season 1 Drama Series
Realiti Drama Series

2008 
Hilang Telemovie
Uncut, Untitled & Paper House Theatre

MODELLING

1998 
Pepsi TVC
Philips MyWeb Infomercial
Fair & Lovely TVC
Twisties TVC
Avon Catalogue Print
Cataloque Shop Print

1999 
Cadbury TVC
Jelita - Fashion Spread Magazine

2000 
Padini Authentic Print

2001 
Cataloque Shop Print

2002 
Loreal Hair Show Model
Yamaha Motorcycle TVC
Equal TVC
100 Plus TVC

2003 
Dutch Lady TVC
Honda Motorcycle TVC
Stabilo TVC

2004 
Remaja - Cover  Magazine
Female - 50 Most Gorgeous People  Magazine

2005 
DiGi Print & Website

2006 
Jelita - Cover  Magazine

2007 
Eh! - 20 Yang Paling Anggun Magazine
Rapi Magazine - Cover Magazine
Health & Beauty - Cover Magazine
Frenz - Cover Magazine
KLUE -Cover Magazine

2008 
Female - Cover Magazine
Wanita - Cover Magazine
Rapi - Cover Magazine
Shape - Cover Magazine
Olay Total Effect TVC & Ambassador

Personal life
Aishah wed Sheikh Abdul Shahnaz on 7 January 2006 and the couple has two daughters, Soraya Ann (born 2008) and Aina Elisabeth (born 2014).  Aishah is a vegan since November 2017.

References

External links

1980 births
People from Selangor 
Actresses from London
People from Wimbledon, London
Naturalised citizens of Malaysia
Malaysian people of British descent
People from Perak
Malaysian people of Scottish descent
Malaysian people of Irish descent
Malaysian people of Javanese descent
Malaysian actresses
Malaysian television personalities
Malaysian people of Malay descent
Living people
Citizens of Malaysia through descent
British people of Malay descent
British people of Malaysian descent
British people of English descent
British people of Scottish descent
British people of Irish descent
British emigrants to Malaysia
So You Think You Can Dance (Malaysian TV series)
Malaysian infotainers